The FIMCAP, which is short for Fédération Internationale des Mouvements Catholiques d’Action Paroissiale (French for "International Federation of Catholic Parochial Youth Movements"), is an umbrella organization for Catholic youth organizations. Its 31 member organizations are based in 28 countries. The FIMCAP was founded in 1962 and is recognised as an official Catholic organization by the Dicastery for Laity, Family and Life. FIMCAP is also a full member of the European Youth Forum.

History 
Already in 1959, French, Belgian and Dutch youth organizations had been working on the project of an international pooling, adopting a joint proposal in Lucerne in October 1959 during the National Presidents' Conference of European Movements affiliated to the International Catholic Youth Federation (ICYF). In 1960, the first delegate conference was held in Munich in the course of the 1960 Eucharistic Congress. On 7-8 October 1961 eleven youth associations officially founded FIMCAP in Munich. The foundation was proclaimed in public on Easter 1962. Since its recognition through the Holy See in 1976, the FIMCAP is an "International Catholic Organization" (ICO) and registered at the Council of Laity in Rome. Since 2006 the FIMCAP is being recognised as an International nongovernmental organization by the Belgian government.

A previous organization had been set up in 1921 in Rome under the name of "International Secretariat of Catholic Youth". The International Secretariat of Catholic Youth was reorganized on 15 September 1948 and renamed to "International Office of Catholic Youth – Bureau international de la jeunesse catholique" and another time reorganized in October 1954 and renamed to "International Federation of Catholic Youth (ICYF)". On 25 April 1968 merged with the "World Federation of Catholic Young Women and Girls" (WFCYWG) to form the "World Federation of Catholic Youth" (WFCY). WFCY ceased to exist in June 1981. Its activities were taken over by FIMCAP, making FIMCAP the biggest international umbrella organization of Catholic youth organizations.

Activities 

Every three years, FIMCAP organizes the World Camp which is an international youth camp. (see: FIMCAP World Camp)
FIMCAP has its own magazine called LINK Magazine. It is published four times a year.
Spiritual activities
Common visits on the World Youth Day
FIMCAP day on 20 November

Activities in Europe
 EuroCourse: The Eurocourse is a European training course for experienced leaders which is hosted every year by another European member organisation.
 EuroCamp: The EuroCamp is an exchange activity for young leaders. (see: FIMCAP Eurocamp)
 Roundabouts: Roundabouts are exchanges between local groups from different member organisations of FIMCAP Europe.
 Speeddating seminars: The speeddating seminars are a platform for groups to meet groups from other countries to start exchanges.
 Visits of international groups to activities of member organizations (e.g. to the national camps of FDF Denmark (see: FDF National Camp), Chiro Flanders and Katholische Jungschar Austria or the Ranfttreffen of Jungwacht Blauring Switzerland)
 Thematic projects
 Online campaigns
e.g. the online campaign "Vote Youthfully" informing about the 2019 European Parliament election.
 Cooperation with the European Fellowship

Thematic work and positions 
FIMCAP and its members have defined for themselves the goal that they want to work together politically to identify and advocate the interests of children, adolescents and young adults within church, society and politics. FIMCAP argues that this is necessarily a part of their work, as FIMCAP is an international association of youth organizations for children, adolescents and young adults throughout the world and that as young people, youth organizations and youth work are confronted with different challenges. FIMCAP argues that this involvement is motivated by the Christian beliefs and shared values. FIMCAP argues that in this way it wants to guarantee and improve the quality of the youth work of their member organizations and FIMCAP, and to participate in shaping the future world and society, preserve our planet for future generations, and improve the prospects in general for future generations. FIMCAP sees sustainable and responsible planning and acting, fair social and economic chances, quality education, peace, charity, and solidarity as elementary requirements to achieve this. Pursuing this purpose, in recent years FIMCAP has defined in particular the following positions:

 Youth mobility: FIMCAP declares that it aims to advocate for improving the mobility of young people and anyone who is involved in youth exchange and activities. In particular FIMCAP together with the European Youth Forum calls for changes to make the  EU visa code and directive more relevant for youth exchanges and international youth work. Additionally, in 2016 FIMCAP joined a joint call of major European youth organizations to preserve the Schengen principles.
 Recognition of (international and religious) youth work
 Sustainable funding of (international) youth work
 Environmental protection, efforts against climate change, and climate justice: FIMCAP emphasizes the responsibility to take care of all creation. FIMCAP calls for strong efforts at the individual and societal levels to stop climate change with its negative consequences. FIMCAP also would raise awareness about the problems already caused by the climate change and calls for solidarity with those affected the most by it. (See also: Laudato si'.) At its 23rd General Assembly FIMCAP decided to focus for three years on sustainability and countering climate change.
 Development and intercontinental cooperation: For FIMCAP, cooperation between the different continents on an equal basis is a core principle. At its 22nd General Assembly FIMCAP decided to focus for three years on advocating for the implementation of the Millennium Development Goals. Similarly, its 25th General Assembly decided to focus for three years on advocating for the implementation of the Sustainable Development Goals. The topic of the General Assembly was "Transforming our World: A child-rights-based approach to the sustainable development goals SDG".
 Empowerment of women and gender equality: FIMCAP emphasizes the importance of women’s empowerment, gender equality and dignity, in facilitating social change. It wants to foster a practical, not only formal legal, equality of women and men.
 Children's Rights: FIMCAP advocates for participation and inclusion of all children in church and society and aims to empower the child to know its rights, as defined by the UN Convention of the Rights of the Child (CRC). FIMCAP declares that it wants to create free and safe places for children to play, explore, discover and thereby strengthen their values, and to find answers to their needs, fight against physical and psychological violence against children, and abolish child labour worldwide.
 Peace and interreligious dialogue: FIMCAP cooperates with Religions for Peace and the European Interfaith Youth Network. Together with other European faith-based youth organisations FIMCAP helped to define the needs and benefits in the field of inter-religious dialogue.

FIMCAP Europe
 Diversity, peace and respect: In early 2015 FIMCAP Europe adopted a common statement for diversity, peace and respect. The statement is presented as a reaction to recent incidents in Europe and other parts in the world like the increase of extremist and far right-wing movements, attacks against refugees and against people with a particular religion or origin and violence of self-appointed “religious” fighters.
Young refugees: In October 2015 FIMCAP Europe adopted a common statement about "Helping together the children and young people who were forced to flee from war, persecution and hunger".
Climate justice and just transition: FIMCAP Europe is a co-founding member of the alliance "Generation Climate Europe". Within the alliance FIMCAP has initiated a working group on climate justice. The working group, led by FIMCAP volunteers, conducted comprehensive consultations to collect the ideas, proposals and demands of young people on how a transition to a green and sustainable Europe that is fast, comprehensive and socially just at the same time can be made possible. The results were published in the "Young Voices on Climate Justice Report".
European Youth Goals: Taking in the 6th cycle of the EU Youth Dialogue FIMCAP contributed to the development of the European Youth Goals. FIMCAP was also selected to participate at the EU Youth Conferences where the European Youth Goals were adopted as part of the delegation of international youth NGOs.

Structure

Statutory bodies 
The highest committee of the FIMCAP is its General Assembly which comes together every three years. Every member organization sends a delegation to the General Assembly.

The administration and management of the FIMCAP is being handled by the intercontinental presidium which consists of two presidents, a Praeses and a Secretary-General. The presidents should be one man and one woman, but if there are no candidates of one gender the jobs might also be given to two women or two men.

The intercontinental bureau (ICB) is composed of the Presidium and representatives of the Continental Conferences. It acts as the FIMCAP Board of Directors.

Beneath these globally working establishments, the FIMCAP is also structured into continental conferences, bureaus and presidiums.

Eligibility and application for membership 
All Catholic youth organizations can apply for membership in FIMCAP. The General Assembly of FIMCAP needs to confirm the membership of an applying member organization in a vote. Non-Catholic youth organizations can obtain the status of associate membership in FIMCAP.

At the General Assembly in Switzerland in 2016 FIMCAP further clarified the criteria of eligibility for membership and updated the membership categories. To become a Full Member of FIMCAP an organization needs to fulfill four criteria:

 being a Catholic organization
 organizes activities for children and / or youth
 being youth-led
 having a direct connection to the local level (typically the parish level)

Organizations fulfilling three out of the four criteria can apply for becoming an Affiliate Member of FIMCAP. Organizations only fulfilling two out of the four criteria can apply for becoming a Sustaining Member of FIMCAP. Full Members have full voting rights, Affiliate Members limited voting rights.

Continental branches and member organizations 
An organization whose name is written in bold is a founding member.

FIMCAP Europe

Presidium of FIMCAP Europe
The presidium of FIMCAP Europe is elected by the delegates of the European member organizations at the EuroConference which takes place every three years. The presidium of FIMCAP Europe consists of four members: three members of the pool of presidents and a spiritual assistant. The elected members of the pool of presidents distribute the responsibilities of the presidium among themselves. These tasks include the representation of FIMCAP Europe in the Intercontinental Bureau Meeting, coordinating activities of FIMCAP Europe, and representing FIMCAP Europe externally. The spiritual assistant consults FIMCAP Europe concerning spiritual and theological issues. The current members of the presidium of FIMCAP Europe are:

Member organizations in Europe

Member organizations in Africa

Member organizations in Asia

Member organizations in Latin America

Former members

General Assemblies

List of former Presidents

World presidents of FIMCAP

European presidents of FIMCAP

Over the years the statutes of FIMCAP Europe have been adapted and the profiles and names of the different positions in the presidium have been changed. Until the pool of presidents was introduced at the EuroConference in Malta in 2017 the presidium of FIMCAP Europe consisted of a president, a vice-president, an activity coordinator and a spiritual assistant. The president was responsible for the representation of FIMCAP Europe in the ICB, the vice-president for the external representation of FIMCAP Europe, the activity coordinator for coordinating the activities of FIMCAP Europe and helping the member organizations with the preparations. The role of the activity coordinator had been introduced at the EuroConference in Switzerland in 2014. It replaced the position of a secretary of FIMCAP Europe.

Asian presidents of FIMCAP

References

External links 
 Homepage of FIMCAP
 Archives of Fimcap  in ODIS - Online Database for Intermediary Structures

 
Youth organizations established in 1962